George Vitéz Worth (born György Woittitz; April 1, 1915 – January 15, 2006) was a Hungarian-born American sabre Olympic medalist fencer.

Early and personal life
Worth was born György Woittitz in Budapest, Hungary, and was Jewish. Because of the political climate in Hungary in 1937, Worth sought to emigrate to the United States, but he was unable to do so directly because he was Jewish and spent two years in Cuba.

Worth finally came to the United States, and changed his name to George Worth, and at the age of 22 he was living in Manhattan in New York City. He became a US citizen.  Worth served for the US in World War II, and fought in the Battle of the Bulge in 1944 and 1945, winning several Bronze Stars.

He later served as Captain of the South Orangetown, New York Ambulance Corps and Chief Commissioner of the Orangeburg, New York Fire Department.

Fencing career
Worth began fencing while he was a youth in Hungary, at Salle Santelli, the salle d’armes of Italo Santelli, a sabre coach and the father of Giorgio Santelli, who became a five-time US Olympic coach. During his two years in Cuba, Worth won the Cuban national sabre championship and fenced often with Ramon Fonst, who had won the Olympic championship in both 1900 and 1904.

US Championship

Worth won the US AFLA national sabre championship in 1954, and was a 5-time medalist. He was a member of 14 national championship teams, representing Salle Santelli his entire career.

Olympics
Worth competed at four Olympic Games for the US Olympic team—in 1948, 1952, 1956, and 1960.

He won a bronze medal at the 1948 Summer Olympics in London at 33 years of age in the team saber competition, and he reached the finals and placed fifth in the individual saber event.

At the 1952 Summer Olympics in Helsinki at 37 years of age, he reached the quarterfinals in the solo event and advanced to the final in the team saber event, where they finished in fourth place.

At the 1956 Summer Olympics in Melbourne at 41 years of age, he reached the semifinals in the sabre event. In the team event they had a bye into the semifinals, where they were defeated.

His final Olympics was the 1960 Summer Olympics in Rome at 45 years of age, where he and his team placed fourth in the sabre competition.

Pan American Games
Worth was also a member of three Pan-American teams on behalf of the US.  He won the individual silver medal in sabre and the team gold medal in sabre and foil at the 1951 Pan American Games in Argentina. He repeated those results at the 1955 Pan American Games in Mexico. At the 1959 Pan American Games in Chicago, he again won a team gold, and came in fifth in the individual competition.

He took the Pan American Games Oath of Participation on behalf of all athletes of the United States during the opening ceremonies of the 1959 Games.

After his fencing career concluded, he was a leading official in the sport.

Hall of Fame
He was inducted into the USFA Hall of Fame in 1974.

See also
 List of select Jewish fencers

References

External links
Olympic record
Pan American Games results
Jews in Sports bio

1915 births
2006 deaths
Jewish male sabre fencers
Fencers at the 1948 Summer Olympics
Fencers at the 1952 Summer Olympics
Fencers at the 1956 Summer Olympics
Fencers at the 1960 Summer Olympics
American male sabre fencers
Jewish American sportspeople
Olympic bronze medalists for the United States in fencing
Martial artists from Budapest
Medalists at the 1948 Summer Olympics
Pan American Games gold medalists for the United States
Pan American Games silver medalists for the United States
Pan American Games medalists in fencing
Hungarian male sabre fencers
Hungarian male foil fencers
Jewish Hungarian sportspeople
Fencers at the 1951 Pan American Games
Medalists at the 1951 Pan American Games
20th-century American Jews
21st-century American Jews
American male foil fencers
Jewish male foil fencers
Hungarian emigrants to the United States